Kapil Kak is a  retired officer of the Indian Air Force, who rose to the rank of Air Vice Marshal. He was the Deputy 
Director at the Centre for Air Power Studies. He was awarded the Vishisht Seva Medal in 1981. Air Vice Marshal Kapil Kak is one of the many petitioners, who have moved the Supreme Court challenging the J&K Reorganisation Bill & the abrogation of Article 370.

References

Indian Air Force air marshals
Living people
Kashmiri people
Recipients of the Ati Vishisht Seva Medal
Indian Air Force officers
Year of birth missing (living people)
Indian air attachés